Meghan Alexandra Lisenby (born December 21, 1992) is an American retired soccer player who most recently played for FC Kansas City.

Club career
Lisenby was selected by FC Kansas City with the 16th overall pick in the 2015 NWSL College Draft. She was added to the roster as an amateur call-up on April 30, 2015. After winning the 2015 NWSL Championship with FCKC, Lisenby announced her retirement ahead of the 2016 season.

Honors 
FC Kansas City
Winner
 National Women's Soccer League: 2015

References

External links 
 FC Kansas City player profile
 Texas A&M player profile
 

1992 births
Living people
American women's soccer players
National Women's Soccer League players
FC Kansas City players
Women's association football defenders
Texas A&M Aggies women's soccer players
FC Kansas City draft picks